Ubi (also known as Oubi) is an Afro-Asiatic language spoken in central Chad.

Notes

References 

Alio, Khalil. 2004. Préliminaires à une étude de la langue kajakse d'Am-Dam, de toram du Salamat, d'ubi du Guéra et de masmaje du Batha-Est (Tchad). In: Gábor Takács (ed.), Egyptian and Semito-Hamitic (Afro-Asiatic) studies: in memoriam W. Vycich. 229–285. Leiden: Brill.

Hutchinson, Noelle, and Eric Johnson. 2006. A sociolinguistic survey of the Ubi language of Chad. SIL Electronic Survey Reports . Dallas: SIL International. Online. URL: https://sil.org/silesr/abstract.asp?ref=2006-002.

East Chadic languages
Languages of Chad
Severely endangered languages